A leg is a limb used to support an animal or object.

Leg or legs may also refer to:

Sports and games
 Leg (sport), one game of a two-legged match
 Leg (darts), a single game of darts
 Leg, one stage of a relay race
 Leg (rallying), one day in a rally racing event

Nickname
 Legs Diamond (1897–1931), an American gangster
 Legs McNeil (born 1956), a co-founder and writer for Punk Magazine

Entertainment
 Legs (comics), a supporting character in various Batman comics
 "Legs" (song), a 1983 song by ZZ Top
 Legs (novel), a 1975 novel by William Kennedy
 The Leg, Scottish rock band
 Legs, a fictional member of the Springfield Mafia in The Simpsons
 "Legs", the pilot episode of Who's Watching the Kids?
 "Legs", a 1985 single by The Art Of Noise

Places
 Leg (Netherlands), a village in the municipality of Alphen-Chaam
 Łęg (disambiguation), many places in Poland
 Lehnice (Lég in Hungarian), a village and municipality in south-west Slovakia

Other uses
 Legs (Chinese constellation)
 Cathetus or leg, in geometry, a side adjacent to the right angle of a right triangle
 Another name for a stream of cash flow in finance; see swap (finance)
 LEG, station code for Lea Green railway station in St. Helens, Merseyside, England
 Legs, narrow drapes at the side of a stage

See also
 Crazy Legs (disambiguation)
 Lung Leg, nickname of American actress Elisabeth Carr (born 1963) 
 
 
 Legg, a surname
 Legge, a surname